Jubiabá is a 1986 Brazilian-French romantic drama film directed by Nelson Pereira dos Santos. Based on the novel of the same name by Jorge Amado, it stars Charles Baiano and Françoise Goussard as two lovers.

Plot
The black orphan Balduíno (Charles Baiano) is adopted by the commendator Ferreira (Raymond Pellegrin), and falls in love with Ferreira's heiress, the white Lindinalva (Françoise Goussard). A day, he is kicked out of the Ferreira's house, becoming a famous malandro in Bahia streets. Even away from Lindinalva, their love is blessed by the pai-de-santo Jubiabá (Grande Otelo).

Cast
Charles Baiano as Antônio Balduíno aka Baldo
Luiz Santana as young Balduíno
Françoise Goussard as Lindinalva
Tatiana Issa as young Lindinalva
Grande Otelo as Jubiabá
Zezé Motta as Rosenda
Julien Guiomar as Luigi
Catherine Rouvel as Amélia
Betty Faria as Zaira
Raymond Pellegrin as Ferreira
Ruth de Souza
Romeu Evaristo 
Eliana Pittman

References

External links

1986 romantic drama films
1986 films
Brazilian romantic drama films
Films about orphans
Films based on works by Jorge Amado
Films directed by Nelson Pereira dos Santos
French romantic drama films
Films about interracial romance
1980s French films